Hope Raue Larson (born 1982) is an American illustrator and cartoonist. Her main field is comic books.

Biography
Larson grew up in Asheville, North Carolina, and attended Carolina Day School. Upon graduation from high school, she matriculated at Rochester Institute of Technology and then transferred to the School of the Art Institute of Chicago, where she graduated with a BFA in 2004. She then moved to Toronto with her husband, Canadian cartoonist Bryan Lee O'Malley. In 2005, they moved to Halifax, Nova Scotia.

From 2008 until 2010, Larson and O'Malley lived in Asheville, North Carolina. They relocated to Los Angeles, California. She and O'Malley divorced in 2014. She returned to Asheville, where she currently lives.

Career
While Larson was in college, Scott McCloud took an interest in her illustrations, encouraging her to create comics. Soon after, she was invited to the webcomics anthology site Girlamatic and produced her first professional comic, a web serial entitled I Was There & Just Returned. Afterwards, Larson concentrated on a number of small, hand-made minicomics, combining her interests in comics, screenprinting, and bookmaking.

She contributed to comics anthologies Flight, True Porn 2, and You Ain't No Dancer, while working on a web-serialized graphic novel, Salamander Dream. This eventually became her first full-length book, published by AdHouse Books in September 2005; she moved to Oni Press for her second graphic novel, Gray Horses (released March 2006).

In 2006, Larson signed a two-book contract with New York publishing house Simon & Schuster. The first book under this deal, Chiggers (released June 18, 2008, under the Atheneum Books Ginee Seo imprint), is a graphic novel about "nerdy teenaged girls" who meet at summer camp. Chiggers is intended for a 9- to 12-year-old audience.

In 2012, Larson adapted Madeleine L'Engle's work as A Wrinkle in Time: The Graphic Novel, published by Margaret Ferguson Books (a Farrar Straus Giroux imprint).
 
In 2016, Larson became the new writer for DC Comics Batgirl, a run that saw the character go on back-packing trip through Asia on a voyage of self-discovery.

In addition to comics, Larson has worked as a freelance illustrator for various clients, including the New York Times.

She has worked as a letterer on such books as Brian Wood and Ryan Kelly's Local.

Larson's book All Summer Long was released by Farrar Straus Giroux in the spring of 2018.

Publishing
In 2006, Larson launched her own publishing imprint, Tulip Tree Press. She has released several minicomics and prints through the Tulip Tree website; the only book released under the Tulip Tree name was House of Sugar, an award-winning collection of Rebecca Kraatz's comic strip, released 15 November 2006.

Acclaim
Larson was nominated for the 2006 Kim Yale Award for Best New Female Talent, and won the 2006 Ignatz Award in the category Promising New Talent. In 2007, Larson won the Eisner Award for Special Recognition (formerly known as "Talent Deserving of Wider Recognition"). She won the Eisner Award again in 2012 for her A Wrinkle in Time adaptation.

Rebecca Kraatz's House of Sugar, Larson's first publishing venture, won the 2007 Doug Wright Award for Best Emerging Talent.

All Summer Long was a Kirkus Reviews Best Book of 2018.

Works

Mainstream comic book work
Batgirl, DC Comics, 2016–2018, with Rafael Albuquerque

Graphic novels
Salamander Dream. AdHouse Books, 2005
Gray Horses. Oni Press, 2006
Chiggers. Atheneum Books, 2008
Mercury. Atheneum Books, 2010
A Wrinkle in Time. Farrar, Straus and Giroux, 2012
Who is AC with Tintin Pantoja. [Athenum Books], 2013
Four Points series
Compass South, Farrar, Straus and Giroux, 2016
Knife's Edge, Farrar, Straus and Giroux, 2017
 Goldie Vance with Brittney Williams. Boom! Studios, 2016
Eagle Rock series
All Summer Long, Farrar, Straus and Giroux, 2018
All Together Now, Farrar, Straus and Giroux, 2020 
All My Friends, Farrar, Straus and Giroux, 2021

Selected short stories and minicomics
 "Sex Rainbow," March 2004 (originally printed as a deck of cards)
 "Compound Eye," April 2004
 "Weather Vain," August 2004 (originally printed in Flight Vol. 2)
 "Mud," February 2005 (originally printed in You Ain't No Dancer #1)
 "Little House in the Big Woods," August 2006 (originally printed in the New York Times)
 "When I Was A Slut," March 2006 (published in Project: Romantic)
 "Henry and Elizabeth," July 2007 (printed in the New York Times, and later expanded to a minicomic)
"Cosplay," February 2018 (published by Dark Horse Books in Secret Loves of Geeks)

See also

Women in comics

References

External links
 Hope Larson's website
Tulip Tree Press , Larson's publishing imprint
Hope Larson on hinah exhibitions
"Thinking in Comics: A Roundtable on the Present and Future of the Graphic Novel featuring Matt Kindt, Hope Larson, Nate Powell, Dash Shaw, James Sturm, Jillian Tamaki, and Will Wilkinson" in Gulf Coast: A Journal of Literature and Fine Arts (26.1)

Alternative cartoonists
American women cartoonists
American female comics artists
American comics writers
American webcomic creators
American people of German descent
American people of Swedish descent
American expatriates in Canada
Living people
Artists from Asheville, North Carolina
School of the Art Institute of Chicago alumni
Female comics writers
Eisner Award winners for Talent Deserving of Wider Recognition
1982 births
American cartoonists